Corky Row Historic District is a historic district located in Fall River, Massachusetts bounded by Plymouth Avenue, Interstate-195 and Second Street. The district contains many early multi-family mill tenement houses, along with the Davol Mills, the Tecumseh Mill No. 1 and several commercial properties.

Perhaps the most famous property listed within the Corky Row Historic District is the house of Andrew J. Borden, located at 230 (92 before 1896) Second Street. This house was the scene of the infamous 1892 double ax-murder of Mr. Borden and his wife, which led to the trial and acquittal of Andrew's daughter, Lizzie Borden. Today, the house has been restored as a bed-and-breakfast.

Historical background
The Corky Row neighborhood was developed between 1840 and 1870 and represents the second major phase of expansion within the city of Fall River. Largely settled by immigrants from County Cork, Ireland who came to work in the city's burgeoning textile industry. The historic district contains dozens of four- and six- family apartment houses in various configurations, as well as a number of classic New England-style triple deckers, many built by the new cotton mills constructed during the 1860s: the Tecumseh, Davol and Robeson Mills, located along Hartwell Street on the eastern edge of the historic district.

Today, the neighborhood contains a mix of residential and commercial uses, including recent developments along Plymouth Avenue, Hartwell Street and along Second and Rodman Streets. The Tecumseh Mill was converted into housing in the 1980s. The Robeson Mills (also known as Luther Manufacturing) were demolished in the 1990s for what is now Applebee's, Walgreens and a more recently built convenience store and gas station at the corner of Rodman Street and Hartwell.

The Corky Row Club, located on Third Street was established in 1938 as an Irish social club. The James T. Griffin playground, located within a few blocks of the Corky Row Club, was named for one of the first to be killed in World War II from the area.

Contributing properties
Mills
Davol Mills (1866, 1872), Rodman Street & Plymouth Avenue
Tecumseh Mill No.1 (1866), Hartwell Street
Houses (partial listing)
Andrew J. Borden House (1845), 230 Second Street
Benjamin Kellogg House (1874), 14-20 Brow Street
Tecumseh Mill Housing (1866), 300-308 Fifth Street
Davol Mill Housing (1870), 367-371 Fifth Street
Moses Dean House (1877), 201-203 Fourth Street
Jeremiah Shea House (1885), 486 Fourth Street
Thomas Gormley House (1881), 825 Plymouth Avenue
Commercial/other
Giesow Building (1894), 120 Third Street
Flat Iron Building (1908), 878-892 Second Street
St. Mary's School (1906), 467 Spring Street
Neill's Hotel (1899), 255 Third Street
Demolished
Robeson Mill No. 1 (1866), Hartwell Street (demolished in 2001)
Robeson Mill No. 2 (Luther Mfg. Co.) (1903), Plymouth Avenue (demolished early 1990s)

Gallery

See also
National Register of Historic Places listings in Fall River, Massachusetts

References

Historic districts in Bristol County, Massachusetts
Fall River, Massachusetts
National Register of Historic Places in Fall River, Massachusetts
Historic districts on the National Register of Historic Places in Massachusetts